Formoso is a municipality in the state of Goiás, Brazil.

Formoso may also refer to

Formoso, Minas Gerais, a municipality in Brazil
Formoso, Kansas, a village in the United States
Porto Formoso, a parish in the municipality of Ribeira Grande in the north of the island of São Miguel in the Azores Islands
Porto Formoso, Cape Verde, a village in the east of the island of Santiago in Cape Verde

See also
Formoso River (disambiguation)
Formosa (disambiguation)